Orphée is a chamber opera in two acts and 18 scenes, for ensemble and soloists, composed in 1991 by Philip Glass, to a libretto (in French) by the composer, based on the scenario of the eponymous film (1950) by Jean Cocteau. Commissioned by the American Repertory Theater in Cambridge, Massachusetts, and the Brooklyn Academy of Music in New York, this is the first part of a trilogy in honour of the French poet. The world premiere of the work took place on 14 May 1993 under the direction of Martin Goldray and the European premiere in London on 27 May 2005 in the Royal Opera House's Linbury Studio Theatre.

Orphée was later performed at the Linz State Theatre, 21 January 2007, at the Herbst Theatre of San Francisco, 26 February 2011 Nicole Paiement conducting, at the George Mason University (Center for the Arts) of Fairfax for two days from 10 February 2012.

In 2000, Paul Barnes produced a piano transcription entitled The Orphée Suite for Piano and first performed on 19 April 2001 at the Greenwich House Music School of New York.

A new production by English National Opera was premiered at the London Coliseum on 15 November 2019.

Roles

Structure 
Act 1
Scene 1, le Café
Scene 2, la Route
Scene 3, le Chalet
Scene 4, Chez Orphée
Scene 5, la Chambre d'Orphée
Scene 6, le Studio d'Orphée
Scene 7, le Bureau du Commissaire
Scene 8, la Poursuite
Scene 9, Chez Orphée

Act 2
Scene 1, le Voyage aux Enfers
Scene 2, le Procès
Scene 3, Orphée et la Princesse
Scene 4, le Verdict
Scene 5, Interlude musical - le retour chez Orphée
Scene 6, Chez Orphée
Scene 7, le Studio d'Orphée
Scene 8, le Retour d'Orphée
Scene 9, la Chambre d'Orphée

Discography 
 The Orphée Suite for Piano, music by Philip Glass, transcription by Paul Barnes (piano), recorded in April 2001. Orange Mountain Music (2003). 
 The Portland Opera Orchestra conducted by Anne Manson, first full version recorded in November 2009. Orange Mountain Music (2010).
 The Orphée Suite for Flute, strings, and percussion , music by Philip Glass, transcription by James Strauss (flute) and Camerata Simon Bolivar, recorded in April 2017. Orange Mountain Music (2019).

Bibliography 
Orphée: The Making of an Opera, Philip Glass, n.n editions (1993) 
Orphée Suite for Piano (score), Philip Glass, Dunvagen Music Publishers (2006) 
Orphée (the play), Le Livre de Poche, La Pochothèque (1995) 
Orphée (scenario of the film), J'ai lu, Librio n°75 (2001)

See also 
The other operas of the trilogy are:
 Les Enfants terribles (1993)
 La Belle et la Bête (1994)

References

External links 
 "Ensemble Parallèle's Orphée", San Francisco Classical Voice
 

1991 operas
French-language operas
Operas by Philip Glass
Operas based on fairy tales
Opera in the United States
Adaptations of works by Jean Cocteau
Operas about Orpheus